Kristýna Salčáková (born 13 August 1987) is a Czech handball player for Achenheim Truchtersheim and the Czech national team.

She participated at the 2018 European Women's Handball Championship.

References

1987 births
Living people
Czech female handball players
Expatriate handball players
Czech expatriate sportspeople in France